Politics of the Business is the third album by American hip hop producer Prince Paul. This album is considered to be a concept album similar to A Prince Among Thieves. The concept for this album, however, is the concept of following-up a concept album that did not sell too well (that album being A Prince Among Thieves). The album features guest appearances from Ice-T, DJ Jazzy Jeff, MF Doom, Biz Markie, Chuck D, Dave Chappelle, Chris Rock, and more. In October 2017, Paul released an updated version of Politics of the Business titled The Redux for free on SoundCloud and Bandcamp. Among the new featured guests on The Redux are De La Soul, RZA, and Bumpy Knuckles.

Track listing

Personnel

References

2003 albums
Prince Paul (producer) albums
Albums produced by Prince Paul (producer)
Concept albums